Shonia Brown (born July 12, 1969) is an American author and an independent book publisher.

Biography
Brown was born and raised in Atlanta, Georgia, where she currently resides with her partner. Brown is involved with the gay community and was co-creator, with Betty Couvertier, of the annual Rock, Rhythm, and Rhyme Artist Explosion, a concert of independent singers, bands, poets, and dancers that has taken place during the Atlanta Pride festival since 2003. She was named the female grand marshal of the 2008 Atlanta Pride Festival.

Brown wrote and published her first novel, A Deeper Love, in 2002. Her writings have appeared in the anthology Ma-Ka Diasporic Juks: Contemporary Writing by Queers of African Descent, among other publications. She founded and maintained an arts and entertainment, technology company designed to market and promote emerging artists. In 2007, Brown released the first anthology in her Nghosi Books New Voices Series, Longing, Lust and Love: Black Lesbian Stories, a collection of African-American lesbian erotica under her Nghosi Books imprint.

Currently, Brown is creating a new project that promotes women in technology (GirlyGeek.biz) through an online portfolio, networking community, and training courses/seminars.

Awards and recognition
In 2005, Brown was awarded the Community Builder Award from the Atlanta Pride Committee. In 2008, she received recognition from the National Black Justice Coalition through their annual Black LGBTIQ History Month campaign as an example of an accomplished Black LGBTIQ individual.

Notes

1969 births
Living people
African-American novelists
21st-century American novelists
American women novelists
21st-century American women writers
21st-century African-American women writers
21st-century African-American writers
20th-century African-American people
20th-century African-American women